This is a list of members of the Tasmanian House of Assembly, elected at the 2021 state election.

1Adam Brooks was declared elected as a member for Braddon on 13 May, but on 14 May Peter Gutwein announced he would not be taking his seat due to facing firearms charges interstate. He was replaced by Felix Ellis in a recount on 3 June 2021.
2Bass MHA Sarah Courtney resigned on 10 February 2022. She was replaced in a recount held on 25 February 2022 by Lara Alexander.
3Bass MHA Peter Gutwein resigned on 8 April 2022. He was replaced in a recount held on 26 April 2022 by Simon Wood.

See also
List of past members of the Tasmanian House of Assembly

References

External links
ABC Elections

Members of Tasmanian parliaments by term
21st-century Australian politicians